Truist Place, formerly SunTrust Financial Centre, is a  skyscraper in Tampa, Florida. It was completed in 1992 and has 36 floors. Cooper Carry designed the building, which is the 4th tallest in Tampa. It was designed to take a  wind load.

The iconic pyramid roof has variable lighting set to the season or events.

As part of SunTrust's merger with BB&T to become Truist, the name of the building was changed to Truist Place in January 2021.

See also

List of tallest buildings in Tampa

References

Skyscraper office buildings in Tampa, Florida
1992 establishments in Florida
Office buildings completed in 1992